The Faculty of Philology and Pedagogics of Kazimierz Pułaski University of Technology and Humanities in Radom is one of eight divisions of Kazimierz Pułaski University of Technology and Humanities in Radom, Poland.

History
The Faculty was established on 25 June 2009 by the Senate of K. Pułaski Technical University of Radom as The Institute of Philology and Pedagogics. Since the academic year 2009–2010 the institute was offering three undergraduate programs in Polish, English, and German studies, both full-time and part-time studies. At the beginning, the institute was based on the Malczewskiego St. 20A, in Faculty of Teachers Training building. Since the academic year 2010–2011, the institute is based on Chrobergo St. 31, in the building of the Faculty of Economics. On 1 March 2012 the Institut was transformed into the Faculty of Philology and Pedagogics.

Programs
 Polish studies – specialties:
 Teacher training with specializations:
 Czech studies
 Cultural studies
 Teaching Polish as a foreign language
 Non-teacher specializations:
 Managing
 Tourism
 Pedagogics
 Publishing
 Translation
 English Studies
 specializations:
 Managing
 Tourism
 Pedagogics
 Publishing
 Translation
 German studies
 specializations:
 Managing
 Tourism
 Pedagogics
 Publishing
 Translation
 Pedagogics
 Early school and preschool education
 Early school and computer education
 Social prevention and rehabilitation
 Counseling and family support
 Childcare education

Postgraduate studies
 The interdisciplinary nature of Polish education

Administration
 Dean – Prof. Dariusz Trześniowski, PhD, D.S.
 Deputy Dean – Dr. Anna Włodarczyk-Stachurska, PhD
 Deputy Dean – Dr. Elżbieta Sałata, PhD

Organization
 Chari of Pedagogics and Psychology
 Department of Computer Science and Media Education
 Chari of Neofilology
 Department of English Studies
 Department of German Studies
 Chari of Polish Studies
 Section of Modern Literature

References

External links
 Official website of Institute

Academic language institutions
Kazimierz Pułaski University of Technology and Humanities in Radom